This is a list of radio stations. There are 22 FM stations and 5 AM stations in Panama City.

Radio station

AM Stations

FM Stations

External links
 Panama Radio Stations An extended list of all Panamanian Radio Stations streaming online, as well as online webcams and live TV stations from Panama
 Panama Radio Stations An updated page with links to Radio Stations and local TV Stations from Panama.
 Panama Financial Radio Station Financial Radio Station.

 

Radio in Panama
Radio stations in Panama